The European Parliamentary and Local Elections (Pilots) Act 2004 is in Act of the Parliament of the United Kingdom (c 2).

The Act allowed an all-postal ballot to be piloted in four regions of the United Kingdom: North East, the East Midlands, Yorkshire and the Humber and the North West, at the local and European Parliament elections.

References
Halsbury's Statutes,

External links
Department for Constitutional Affairs - Elections - European Parliamentary and Local Elections (Pilots)
The European Parliamentary and Local Elections (Pilots) Act 2004, as amended from the National Archives.
The European Parliamentary and Local Elections (Pilots) Act 2004, as originally enacted from the National Archives.
Explanatory notes to the European Parliamentary and Local Elections (Pilots) Act 2004.

United Kingdom Acts of Parliament 2004
Election law in the United Kingdom
Election legislation